Joseph Alexander Thomson (born 14 January 1997) is a Scottish professional footballer, who plays as a midfielder for NIFL Premiership side Larne. Thomson started his senior career at Celtic and he has played on loan at Dumbarton, Livingston, two spells at Queen of the South and Dunfermline Athletic. Thomson has also been capped for Scotland at every age level from under-15 to under-21.

Personal life
Thomson was born in Paisley and played for Gleniffer Thistle Boys Club. He was a youth signing with Rangers before switching to Celtic at under-12 level. He attended Williamwood High School then the Celtic school project at St Ninian's High School, Kirkintilloch.

Club career

Celtic
Thomson played regularly for the Celtic Development Squad and featured in the first-team squad versus Villarreal C.F., PSV Eindhoven, FC Den Bosch, Stade Rennais and Sparta Prague who he scored against in the Maspalomas Cup. On 22 August 2015, Thomson made his first-team debut when he appeared as a substitute during the second half of Celtic's 3–1 victory at Tannadice versus Dundee United. He left Celtic at the end of the 2017–18 season.

Loan spells
Thomson joined Scottish Championship club Dumbarton in August 2016, for the first half of the season. He scored his first senior goal in a 2–2 draw with Dunfermline Athletic on 29 October 2016. Thomson departed the Sons on 31 December 2016, when his loan deal ended.

On 1 January 2017, Thomson subsequently joined fellow Scottish Championship club Queen of the South for the second half of the season, scoring on his debut against St Mirren on 7 January 2017. Thomson then returned to his parent club, Celtic at the end of the 2016–17 season.

At the start of August 2017, Thomson was sent out on loan to Livingston for six months to gain first-team experience, but was recalled back to his parent club in early September 2017, due to a disagreement between the clubs regarding the handling of the player, having only played three league matches for the West Lothian side.

On 29 December 2017, Thomson joined Queen of the South for a second spell on loan. He initially joined on an emergency loan deal, although he remained with the side until the end of the season. On 20 March 2018, Thomson scored twice in the club's first league victory at Tannadice since 1933, in a 3–2 win versus Dundee United.

Dunfermline Athletic
On 16 June 2018, Thomson signed for Scottish Championship club Dunfermline Athletic. He made his debut starting in a 3–0 win versus Peterhead in the Scottish League Cup on 17 July 2018, and scored his first goal in a league match against Dundee United on 4 August 2018.
Thomson was voted Fans Player of the Year in his first season with Dunfermline. After missing part of his second season recovering from injury Thomson was released in May 2020 at the end of his contract along with 16 other players as COVID-19 impacted the clubs financial position.

Derry City
In June 2020, Thomson joined League of Ireland club Derry City on an initial 18 months contract and he scored in his Europa League debut. In November 2021 after winning the previous season's Supporters Player of the Year award Thomsons contract was extended for another 2 years.

Thomson won the 2022 FAI cup with Derry City

Larne
Thomson signed for Larne on 6th January 2023 and made his debut away to Glentoran on 14th January 2023.

He made his first starting appearance for Larne on 17th January 2023 in a County Antrim Cup Final victory over Linfield

International career 

Thomson was selected for the Scotland U17 team in the UEFA under-17 Championship in 2014, where the Netherlands beat them in the semi finals.

He was selected for the under-20 squad in the 2017 Toulon Tournament.  After a historic first ever win against Brazil, which was at any level. Scotland later won the bronze medal. It was the nations first ever medal at the competition.

In March 2017, Thomson made his debut for the Scotland Under-21 team in a friendly versus Estonia.

Career statistics

Honours 

Derry City

FAI Cup 2022

Larne

County Antrim Shield 2022-23

References

External links

Player profile at The Celtic Wiki

1997 births
Living people
Footballers from Paisley, Renfrewshire
Scottish footballers
Rangers F.C. players
Celtic F.C. players
Scottish Professional Football League players
Association football midfielders
Scotland youth international footballers
Dumbarton F.C. players
Queen of the South F.C. players
Livingston F.C. players
Dunfermline Athletic F.C. players
League of Ireland players
Derry City F.C. players
Scotland under-21 international footballers